Jodi Shilling (born February 4, 1979, in California) is an American actress who is currently best known for her recurring role as Tiffany on the Disney Channel Original Series That's So Raven.

Actress-Filmography

Comedy Central Laughs for Life Telethon 2003 (2003) as JessicaComedy Central Laughs for Life Telethon 2004 (2004) as JessicaA New Tomorrow (2005) (post-production) as AmberThat's So Raven as TiffanyOne Foot in, One Foot Out (2006) as JillianA New Tomorrow (2007) as Amber12 Miles of Bad RoadWreck the Halls (2008)
 Short Track (2008)
 The Man in the Silo (2008)Hannah Montana'' (2008) as Robin

External links
 Jodi Shilling's Official Site
 
 Photo Gallery
 https://web.archive.org/web/20070510112444/http://profile.myspace.com/index.cfm?fuseaction=user.viewprofile

American television actresses
Actresses from California
1979 births
Living people
21st-century American women